Winogradskyella pulchriflava is a bacterium from the genus of Winogradskyella which has been isolated from sediments from the Sea of Japan in Korea.

References

Flavobacteria
Bacteria described in 2013